The China women's national handball team is the national team of People's Republic of China. It is governed by the China Handball Federation and takes part in international handball competitions.

Results

Olympic Games

World Championship
 1986 – 9th
 1990 – 8th
 1993 – 14th
 1995 – 13th
 1997 – 22nd
 1999 – 18th
 2001 – 11th
 2003 – 19th
 2005 – 17th
 2007 – 21st
 2009 – 12th
 2011 – 21st
 2013 – 18th
 2015 – 17th
 2017 – 22nd
 2019 – 23rd
 2021 – 32nd
 2023 – Qualified

Asian Games
1990 –  Silver Medal
1994 –  Bronze Medal
1998 – 4th place
2002 –  Bronze Medal
2006 – 4th place
2010 –  Gold Medal
2014 – 4th place
2018 –  Silver Medal

Asian Championship
 1987 –  Silver Medal
 1989 –  Silver Medal
 1991 –  Bronze Medal
 1993 –  Silver Medal
 1995 –  Silver Medal
 1997 –  Silver Medal
 1999 –  Silver Medal
 2000 – 4th
 2002 –  Bronze Medal
 2004 –  Silver Medal
 2006 –  Silver Medal
 2008 –  Silver Medal
 2010 –  Bronze Medal
 2012 –  Silver Medal
 2015 –  Bronze Medal
 2017 –  Bronze Medal
 2018 –  Bronze Medal
 2022 –  Bronze Medal

Current squad
Squad for the 2021 World Women's Handball Championship.

Head coach:  Kim Gap-soo

References

External links

IHF profile

National team
Women's national handball teams
Handball